In protest of a recent abortion law in Texas, the 2021 Women's March took place in all 50 US states on Saturday, October 2, 2021, two days before the United States Supreme Court began its upcoming term on Monday, October 4.

United States

Listed below are over 700 events in the U.S. in support of the 2021 Women's March

Notes

References

External links 
 

2021 in American politics
2021 in North America
2021 protests
2021-related lists
Feminism-related lists
Foreign relations of the United States
History of women's rights
Human rights-related lists
October 2021 events
Lists of places
Protest marches
2021 in women's history
Women's marches
Gatherings of women
List of 2021 Women's March locations
Articles containing video clips